Sir Allan Arthur was a Scotland international rugby football player. He later moved to India as a merchant, where he became a civil servant. He was knighted in 1900 for his Indian public service work. He was named as one of Queen Victoria's birthday knights.

Rugby Union career

Amateur career

Arthur went to school at Glasgow Academy and then Merchiston College.

Arthur played for Glasgow Academicals.

Provincial career

Arthur was capped by Glasgow District.

He also played for the West of Scotland District on 28 February 1876.

International career

Horse-racing career

The newspaper The Sportsman noted in its obituary of Arthur that he was a noted owner of race horses. Arthur became the chairman of the Royal Calcutta Turf Club. The newspaper noted that although Arthur owned a number of horses, his colours did not merit any great success.

Business and Civil Service career

Allan's father, another Arthur Allan, was a merchant in the firm of Henry Montieith and Company.

At the age of 20, the younger Allan went to India. He began in the employ of the merchants Finlay, Muir and Company. He later became a director of the merchant firm Ewing and Company.

As a merchant, Allan became involved in the trade of jute. He became a director of an extensive jute shipping company: R. Steel and Company Limited.; and a director of the Manipiet Jute Company. He was also a director of the Union Baling Company.

He was elected four times as the president of the Bengal Chamber of Commerce. He retired in 1920.

His civil service career began in parallel. He was appointed a member of the Viceroy's Leglistaive Council; and in 1890 became the Sheriff of Calcutta. For his public services he received a knighthood in 1900.

Family

Arthur was unmarried. He died at his home at Larch Hill in Moffat. He was the brother of John Arthur who was also capped for Scotland during the first ever rugby international.

Arthur's funeral was held on 11 October 1923. The funeral processed from Glasgow Central Station to the Necropolis, where he is buried.

References

Sources

 Bath, Richard (ed.) The Scotland Rugby Miscellany (Vision Sports Publishing Ltd, 2007 )

1857 births
1923 deaths
Glasgow Academicals rugby union players
Glasgow District (rugby union) players
Rugby union players from Moffat
Scotland international rugby union players
Scottish rugby union players
West of Scotland District (rugby union) players
Rugby union forwards
Knights Bachelor
Members of the Imperial Legislative Council of India